Xarifiidae is a family of cyclopoid copepods in the order Cyclopoida. There are about 5 genera and more than 90 described species in Xarifiidae.

Genera
These five genera belong to the family Xarifiidae:
 Botegokika Ho, Cheng & Dai, 2013
 Lipochrus Humes & Dojiri, 1982
 Orstomella H.o.Humes, 1968
 Xarifia Humes, 1960
 Zazaranus Humes & Dojiri, 1983

References

Cyclopoida
Articles created by Qbugbot
Crustacean families